This list of naval battles is a chronological list delineating important naval battles that have occurred throughout history, from the beginning of naval warfare with the Hittites in the 12th century BC to Piracy off the coast of Somalia in the 21st century. If a battle has no commonly used name it's referred to as "Action of (date)" within the list below.

Ancient

Middle Ages

5th century

 456 – Romans under Flavius Ricimer defeat Vandals near Corsica
 461 Cartagena – Vandals destroy a newly built West Roman fleet
 468 Cape Bon – Vandals defeat East and West Romans under Basiliscus

6th century

 551 Sena Gallica – The Byzantines defeat the Ostrogoths

7th century

 655 Battle of the Masts – Arabs under Uthman defeat Byzantines under Constans II
 663 August Battle of Baekgang – Tang China and Silla defeat Yamato Japan and Baekje
 676 Battle of Gibeolpo – Silla defeat Tang China
 677 or 678 First Arab siege of Constantinople – Byzantines defeat Arabs (first use of "Greek fire")
 697? – Greeks under John defeat Arabs
 698 Carthage – Arabs defeat Greeks under John at Carthage
 698 – Imperial Constantinopolitan fleet defeats Cibyrrhaeot rebels

8th century

 717, 3 September Second Arab siege of Constantinople – Byzantines under Leo III the Isaurian defeat Arabs
 718, Spring Second Arab siege of Constantinople – Byzantines under Leo III defeat Arabs
 719, Dalriadan civil war resulted in a conflict between two opposing groups of curraghs, mentioned in the Senchus Fer n-Alban
 727 – Byzantine central imperial fleet destroys provincial Helladic and Cyclades fleets under Agallianos Kontoskeles.
 746 Battle of Keramaia – The Cibyrrhaeots annihilate the Egypt-based fleet of the Umayyad Caliphate

9th century
806? – Moors defeat Franks under Hadumar near Corsica
807 – Franks under Burchard (a lieutenant of Charlemagne) defeat Moors at Sardinia
813 – Byzantines defeat Arabs
813 – Franks under Irmingar defeat Moors near Majorca
820 – Arabs defeat Franks near Sardinia
822 – Constantinople: Byzantine central imperial fleet defeats rebel provincial fleets during the revolt of Thomas the Slav
829 – Battle of Thasos: Cretan Saracens defeat Byzantines
841 – Arabs defeat Venetian squadron near Taranto
849 Ostia – Italian city-states vs Muslims off southern Italy
851 Sandwich – Athelstan defeats Viking fleet near Kent
 Battle of Kardia – Byzantine admiral Niketas Ooryphas defeats a fleet of Cretan Saracens under the renegade Photios.
 Battle of the Gulf of Corinth – Byzantine admiral Niketas Ooryphas defeats a fleet of Cretan Saracens and kills their commander, the renegade Photios.
880 Battle of Cephalonia – Byzantines under Nasar destroy Aghlabid fleet
Battle of Stelai (also Punto Stilo or Milazzo) – Byzantines under Nasar destroy Aghlabid fleet
885 – Frisians defeat Vikings
888 Battle of Milazzo – Aghlabids defeat Byzantines

10th century

 906 – Byzantines under Himerios defeat Arabs on St. Thomas' Day
 912 – Battle of Chios (912) – Syrian-Cilician fleet defeats Byzantine squadron under Himerios
 932 – Battle of Lang-shan Jiang
 941 – Rus'-Byzantine War – Byzantine fleet under Theophanes destroys Kievan Rus' fleet under Igor near Bosporus Strait
 938 – First Battle of Bach Dang River – Vietnamese defeat Southern Han fleet
 956 – Tunisian fleet destroyed by Christians near Mazara
 958 – Tunis vs Christians in Messina Strait
 965 – Battle of the Straits – Fatimid fleet destroys Byzantine fleet under Niketas Abalantes at the Straits of Messina
 975 – Song forces defeat Tang forces
 981 Second Battle of Bach Dang – Vietnam defeats Chinese Song forces
 998 – Venetians under Orseolo defeat Narentan pirates

11th century

 1000 September 9 Swold – Swedes and Danes defeat Norwegians
 1004 – Venetians under Pietro Orseolo II defeat Arabs at Messina
 1005 – Pisans defeat Arabs at Messina
 1024 – Lemnos – Byzantines defeat Rus' fleet in the Lemnos Island
 1026 The Helgeå – Danes under Ulf Jarl defeat Swedes and Norwegians under Anund Jacob and Olaf II Haraldsson (Olaf the Stout) in southern Sweden
 1032 – A joint Byzantine-Ragusan squadron defeats a Muslim corsair fleet in the Adriatic
 1032 – According to one hypothesis, battle at Iron Gate mentioned in Russian chronicles was a naval battle, where Novgorod fleet tries to reach Tallinn Bay, but is defeated by Estonians.
 1035–1036 – Last Arab corsair raids against the Aegean islands are repulsed by the Byzantines
 1043 Rus'-Byzantine War – Byzantines defeat Rus' squadron in the Bosporus
 1062 Niså – Norwegians under Harald Hardrada defeat Danes in Kattegat
 1081 Dyrrhachium – Venetian-Byzantine fleet defeats Normans near Durazzo, Albania
 1084 – Normans under Robert Guiscard (20 vessels?) defeat Venetians or Byzantines in a series of battles off Albania/Corfu

12th century
 1123 Ibelin – Venetian fleet disperses Fatimid Egyptian fleet near Jaffa
 1137 Bigano – Venetians defeat Normans/Roger II of Sicily at Trani, Italy
 1149 Cape Malea – Venetians and Byzantine Greeks defeat Normans
 1153 Siege of Ascalon – Venetians defeat Fatimid Arabs near Tel Aviv
 1156 January – Celtic ships defeat Viking squadron north of Scotland
 1161 Nov 16 Tangdao – Song forces defeat Jin forces during the Jin–Song wars
 26–27 Nov Caishi – Song forces defeat Jin forces
 1177 – Venetians and the Vatican defeat Genoese and Pisans
 1183 November 17 Mizushima – Battle off coast of Shikoku
 1184 June 15 Fimreite – King Sverre Sigurdsson of Norway defeats and kills rival King Magnus Erlingsson in the Sognefjord
 1185 March 22 Yashima – Battle off coast of Shikoku
 25 April Dan-no-ura – Decisive victory for Minamoto clan off present-day Shimonoseki, Yamaguchi, Japan, ends Genpei War
 7 November – Byzantines under Alexios Branas defeat Normans at Demetrias (Volos), Greece

13th century

 1213 May 30 and 31 Damme – English under William Longsword sink most of fleet of France's King Philip II in the harbor of Damme
 1217 August 24 Dover (South Foreland) – The "Fight off Sandwich". Fleet of English Hubert and Burgh defeat French fleet of Eustace the Monk off Dover. There were actually 2 battles – this describes the 2nd
 1241 May 3 (First) Meloria – Pisans under Ansaldo de Mari defeat Genoese
 1258 June 25 – Battle of Acre – Venetian fleet defeats Genoese fleet off Acre
 1263 – Settepozzi – A Venetian fleet of 38 ships under Gilberto Dandolo defeats a joint Byzantine-Genoese fleet of 48 ships off the Peloponnese
 1264 – Saseno – Genoese defeat Venetians
 1266 Trapani – Venetians defeat Genoese
 c. 1273/1275 – Demetrias – Byzantine fleet defeats coalition of Lombard and Venetian lords of Euboea and Crete
 1278 July 25 – Algeciras – Castilians vs Morocco and Granada
 Before 1279 – Conrad Lancia defeats Muslim fleet near Tunisia 
 1279 March 19 Yamen – Yuan Dynasty defeats Song Dynasty
 1282 October 11 – Peter de Queralt defeats Angevin fleet near Reggio di Calabria (details)
 14 October – Peter de Queralt defeats Angevin fleet near Nicotera (details)
 1283 July 8 Malta – Aragonese-Sicilians under Roger of Lauria defeat Angevins in Grand Harbour, Malta
 1284 June 5 Gulf of Naples – Aragonese-Sicilians under Roger of Lauria defeat Neapolitans and capture Charles of Salerno (later Charles II of Naples)
 6 August (Second) Meloria – Genoese utterly destroy the Pisan fleet near Tuscany, Italy
 1285 August? (possibly mid-September) – 11 Catalan galleys defeat 25 French galleys under Guillaume de Lodève at Rosas
 4 September (probably) Les Formigues (Las Hormigas) – Aragonese-Sicilians under Roger of Lauria defeat French under di Mari and de Orreo near Barcelona
 1287 June 23 The Counts – Aragonese-Sicilians under Roger of Lauria defeat Angevins near Naples
 1288 Third Battle of Bach Dang – Vietnamese defeat Mongols
 1294 Laiazzo – Genoese defeat Venetians near Laiazzo
 1298 September 9 Curzola – Genoese fleet under Lamba Doria defeats Venetians under Andrea Dandolo
 1299 July 4 Cape Orlando – Angevins under Roger of Lauria defeat Sicilians under d'Oria off northern Sicily
 1300 June 14 Ponza – Angevins under Roger of Lauria defeat Sicilians under d'Oria near Naples

14th century

 1304 August 18 (2 days) Zierikzee – French fleet under Genoese admiral Renier Grimaldi destroys Flemish fleet
 1319 July 23 Chios – Knights Hospitaller and Genoese of the Lordship of Chios score a crushing victory over an Aydinid fleet
 1338 September 23 Arnemuiden – Philip VI of France beats English fleet of Edward III of England off the coast of Zeeland. It was the first naval battle using artillery.
 1340 June 24 Sluys – Edward III of England beats Franco-Genoese fleet of Philip VI of France off the coast of Flanders and gains control of the English Channel
 1342 Guernsey
 1350 August 29 (Old Style) L'Espagnols-sur-Mer – 50 English ships under Edward III and the Black Prince defeat 40 Castilian ships
 1352 Bosporus – Genoese under Paganino Doria vs Venetians, Byzantine Greeks and Aragonese in Bosporus Strait
 1353 August 29 La Loiera – Venetians and Aragonese defeat Genoese near Sardinia
 1354 Sapienza Genoese under Paganino Doria defeat Venetians under Niccolò Pisani in the southern Peloponnese
 1363 August 30 – October 4 Lake Poyang – Mings under Zhu Yuanzhang defeat Hans under Chen Youliang
 1372 June 22 and 23 La Rochelle – Castilian fleet defeats English fleet near La Rochelle
 1378 – Venetians under Vettor Pisani defeat Genoese near Cape d'Anzio
 1379 May 7 Pola – Genoese under Luciano Doria defeat Venetians under Vittore Pisani near Pula
 1380 June Chioggia – Venetians under Andrea Contarini defeat Genoese
 1387 March 24 and 25 Margate – English fleet under Richard, Earl of Arundel defeat Franco-Castilian-Flemish wine fleet under Sir Jean de Bucq

15th century

 1403 October 7 Modon – Genoese fleet under the French Marshal Boucicaut is defeated by the Venetians under Carlo Zeno
 1416 May 29 Gallipoli – Venetians defeat Ottoman Turks 
 15 August (OS?) Harfleur – English defeat French near Harfleur
 1417 – English defeat French and Genoese
 1419 – Castilians defeat English-Hanseatic fleet at La Rochelle
 1427 September Battle of Wieringen – Burgundian fleet defeats fleet of Jacqueline of Bavaria
 1427 – Battle of the Echinades – Byzantines defeat fleet of Carlo I Tocco
 1431 – Venetians and Florentines under Pietro Loredano and Paolodi Vanni Rucellai defeat Genoans under Francesco Spinola
 1448 San Vincenzo – Neapolitans defeat Florentines
 1453 April 12 – Fall of Constantinople – Turks attack Byzantine vessels defending Constantinople
 20 April – Fall of Constantinople – Turks fail to prevent Genoese supply ships reaching Constantinople
 1457 August – 3 Polish ships defeat Danish-Livonian fleet
1463 September 15 Battle of Vistula Lagoon – Polish and Prussian Confederation victory over Teutonic Order fleet
 1476 August 13 – French defeat Genoese near Cape St. Vincent
 1478 – 11 Portuguese ships defeat and capture a Castilian fleet of 35 ships at the Battle of Guinea
 1495 May 2 – Battle of Rapallo – Genoese fleet under Francesco Spinola defeats French fleet under de Miolans, all French ships are captured.
 1499 August 12, 20, 22 and 25 Zonchio (Sapienza/Navarino/First Lepanto) – Turks under Daoud Pasha defeat Venetians under Antonio Grimani and are able to capture the fortress of Lepanto
 1500 August Modon (Second Lepanto) – Turks under Kemal Reis defeat Venetians

16th century

 1508 Battle of Chaul – Alliance of Mamluk, Gujrat and Calicut defeat Portuguese
1509 February 3 Diu – Portugal's Indian viceroy defeats a combined Egyptian-Gujarat Sultanate fleet off Gujarat, India, and controls spice trade
 1510 – Maltese under Prégent de Bidoux defeat Venetians
 1512? – Genoese under Andrea Doria defeat Moors at Algiers
 1512 August 10 St Mathieu – English defeat French off Brest; Regent and Marie la Cordelière sunk
 1521 Battle of Tunmen – Ming Chinese defeat Portuguese
 1522 Battle of Xicaowan – Ming Chinese defeat Portuguese
 1526 – Swedes and Lübeckers defeat pirate fleet
 1529 – Ottoman Turks under Khair-ad-Din (Barbarossa) defeat Spanish
 1535 early  – 20 June Swedes/Danes/Prussians defeat 9 Lübeck ships
 1535 June? – Swedes/Danes/Prussians defeat 10 Lübeck ships at Fyen
 1538 September 28 Preveza – Ottoman Turk fleet under Khair-ad-Din defeats Spanish-Venetian-Papal fleet
 1541 – Tsuruhime led an army into naval battle and drove the Ōuchi Yoshitaka into the open sea.
 1542 - Ningbo Massacre (1542) - battle between Ming China and Portugal, Chinese victory
 1545 July 18 and 19 The Solent – French attack English off Portsmouth; Mary Rose sinks
 15 August – English fight French off Portsmouth
 1549 early August (?) – English defeat French near Channel Islands
 1552 Ponza – Ottoman Turks under Sinan Pasha defeat Genoese under Andrea Doria off western Italy
 1555 August 11 – Bloody and inconclusive melée between French privateers and a Dutch merchant fleet off Calais
 1558 – Portuguese fight English and French off Guinea
 13 July – English under Count Egmont defeat French under Marshal de Thermes off Gravelines
 1560 May 11 Djerba – Turkish galleys defeat Christian force near Djerba, Tunisia

Northern Seven Years' War (1563–70)

Later 16th century

 1565 18 October Battle of Fukuda Bay - battle between Japan and Portugal, Portuguese victory
 1568 September 23 – Spanish under Martin Enriquez defeat English under Hawkins at San Juan de Ulúa, Mexico Offsite link
 1570 – English under Burrough and Hodsdon defeat Danes in the Baltic Sea
 15 July – Turkish galliots under Uluch Ali defeat Maltese galleys under Saint-Clement near Gozo
 1571 January – Venetians under Marco Querini defeat Turks near Famagusta, Cyprus
 7 October Lepanto – Christian coalition decisively defeats Ottoman Turks in a large galley fight off western Greece
 1572 August 7 and 10 – Venetians under Colonna vs Turks under Kilitch Ali between Cervi and Cerigo and near Cape Matapan
 September/October – Several skirmishes between Spanish/Venetians and Turks
 1573 April 17 Flushing – Sea Beggars defeat Spanish under Sancho d'Avila
 22 April Borsele – Sea Beggars beat back a Spanish fleet under d'Avila
 26 May Haarlemmermeer – Spanish under Bossu defeat Sea Beggars
 11 October Zuiderzee – Sea Beggars under Cornelis Dirkszoon defeat Spanish under Bossu
 1574 January 29 Oosterschelde – Sea Beggars under Willem Boisot defeat Spanish under Luis de Resquesens
 30 May Battle of lillo – Sea Beggars under Boisot defeat a Spanish fleet
 June – Swedes capture 3 Lubeckers plus 15 merchantmen
 1576 August and 1578 Kizugawaguchi – Blockade efforts in Siege of Ishiyama Honganji, just off Osaka, Japan
 1582 July 26 Battle of Terceira (Battle of Ponta Delgada) – Spanish under Alvaro de Bazán defeat French, Portuguese, Dutch and English under Filippo Strozzi in the Azores
 1582 July 27 Battle of Vila Franca Alvaro de Bazán wins a second battle at the Azores in as many days.
 1583? Maltese under Avogadro vs Turks
 1583 August 3 – Venetians defeat Maltese under Avogadro between Cerigotto and Cape Spada
 1585 April – Maltese galleys defeat and capture Turkish sailing ship
 Nguyen Lord navy defeats Shirahama Kenki pirate fleet.
 1586 – English under Edward Wilkinson vs Spanish and Maltese under Pedro de Gamboa y Leyva at Pantellaria
 1588 July and August – Defeat of the Spanish Armada off southern England
 September – Spanish Armada in Ireland
 1589 – Defeat of the English Armada
 1591 about 13 June – English vs Spanish under Diego de la Ribera
 Battle of Flores – Spanish repel English near the Azores
 1592 May 7 Okpo – Korean navy under Yi Sun-sin defeats Japanese navy under Todo Takatora.
 29 May Sacheon – Korean Navy defeats Japanese with the Turtle Ship.
 14 August Hansan Island – Korean navy defeats Japanese fleet in the bay of Hansan island.
 1 November Busan – Korean Naval demonstration to Japanese navy at the Busan bay. However, they could not occupy Busan.
 1595 about late June – Maltese vs Bizertans (details)
 1595–96 – Spanish defeat English raiding/invasion expeditions of the Spanish Main led by Drake and Hawkins
 1597 July 15 or 28 August Chilchonryang – Japanese Navy in conjunction with the Japanese army, defeats the Korean Navy, led by Won Gyun.
 26 October Myeongnyang – 13 Korean ships under Yi Sun-sin defeats 330 Japanese ships.
 – Bizertans vs Genoese and Romans
 – Spanish defeat the English Islands Voyage near the Azores.
 1598 December 16 Battle of Noryang – Chinese Admiral Chen Lin and Korean Admiral Yi Sun-sin heavily damage more than 100 Japanese ship, however, 150 Japanese ship succeeds in retreating.
 1600 December 14 – Action of 14 December Dutch vs Spanish at Manila

17th century

Early 17th century

 1601 December 27 Bantam – Dutch defeat Portuguese in Bantam Bay
 1602 October 3 Sluis – Dutch under Jacob van Duivenvoorde defeat Spanish under Frederik Spinola
 1603 May 26 Sluis – Dutch under Joos de Moor beat back Spanish under Frederik Spinola
 ?? 1603 October – Tuscan galleys defeat Tunisians
 1604 October – Tuscans defeat Tunisians (details)
 1605 – Dutch fleet under Willem Haultain attacks and partly destroys a Spanish fleet of transport ships near Dover
 1605 November Attack on Salinas de Araya – Spanish under Luis Fajardo defeat a fleet of Dutch smugglers and privateers
 1606 June or October Battle of Cape St. Vincent – Spanish under Luis Fajardo defeat Dutch under Willem Haultain
 1606 August 17 Cape Rachado – Indecisive action between a Dutch fleet under Cornelis Matelief de Jonge and a Portuguese fleet near Malacca
 21 September Second battle of Cape Rachado – Dutch under Cornelis Matelief de Jonge destroy Portuguese ships
 1607 April 25 Gibraltar – Dutch under Jacob van Heemskerk destroy a Spanish fleet
 20 October – Tuscans under Beauregard defeat Turkish trade fleet (details)
 1609 about May – French under Beaulieu vs Tunisians (details)
 29 June – Spanish-French raid on La Goulette, Tunisia (details)
 – Venetians defeat Turks near Paxos (details)
 (late)? – Turks under Khalil defeat French under Fressinet near Cyprus (details)
 (late)? – Turks vs French under Beaulieu
 1610 3–6 January - Nossa Senhora da Graça incident - battle between Japan and Portugal, Portuguese inflict heavy losses on Japan
 1610 August 21 – Tuscans vs Turks (details)
 10 October – Tuscans vs Turks (details)
 1611 August (end)? – Minor action between Danes and Swedes in Kalmar Sound
 1612 May 23 or 25 – Sicilian-Neapolitan galley fleet defeats Tunisians at La Goulette (details)
 29–30 November Swally – British East India Company fleet defeats Portuguese fleet near Surat, India
 1613 August 29 – Sicilians under de Aragon defeat Turkish trade fleet (details)
 1615 January 20–? (Old Style) – English defeat Portuguese in mainly minor skirmishes
 17 and 18 July – Spanish vs Dutch (same as next?)
 – Dutch under Spilbergen defeat Spanish under de Pulgar near Valdivia, Peru (details)
 1616 January – Spanish vs ? (details)
 about March? – Spanish under Ribera defeat Tunisians at La Goulette (details)
 29 April – Tuscans under Inghirami defeat Turks near Euboea (details)
 14–16 July – Spanish under Ribera defeat Turks in the first regular action between galleys and sailing ships in the Mediterranean (details)
 July – Spanish versus Dutch (details)
 about October (possible engagement) – Neapolitans/Sicilian galleys defeat larger Turkish galley fleet
 1617 April 13 – Spanish under Ribera vs Venetians
 12 June – Minor skirmish between Neapolitans/Sicilians and Venetians
 Playa Honda – Dutch defeat Spanish
 19 and 20 November – Inconclusive battle between Sicilians and Venetians (details)
 1618 June 24 – Venice hires Dutch ships and fights Spanish (details)
 2 and 3 July – Dutch under Moy Lambert and Spanish under Vidazabal defeat Algerines
 23–28 December – English vs Dutch near Jakarta (details)
 1619 January 18 and 19 – Maltese vs Algerians near Malta (details)
 1 March – English vs Dutch near Jakarta (details)
 31 May – Dutch defeat French at the mouth of the Vilaine River
 – English defeat Portuguese
 1620 May 11 – Venetians under Nani defeat Spanish under Ribera (details)
 26 June – Tuscans defeat Bizertans (details)
 28 December – English (East India Company) defeat Portuguese at Cape Jask
 1622 July 13–14 – English and Dutch defeat Portuguese near Mozambique
 October – French vs Rochellais (Huguenot) rebels near La Rochelle (details)
 Dutch ships under Joachim Swartenhondt escorting a convoy repel a Spanish squadron near Gibraltar
 1622 – English naval bombardment of Algiers
 1624 October 3 – A combined squadron of fifteen Neapolitan (Spain), Tuscan, and Papal galleys defeat a squadron of six Algerian ships on the island of San Pietro, near Sardinia (details)
 1625 January – French Rochellais rebels capture French fleet at Blavet
 1 and 3 February –  Portuguese defeat English and Dutch (details)
 26 June – Bizertans defeat Maltese near Syracuse, Sicily (details)
 15 September – French under Soubise defeat hired Dutch ships near Rochelle
 1626? – French with hired English and Dutch ships defeat Huguenot fleet near Rochelle
 1626 late – Danes defeat Dunkirkers (details)
 1627 November 28 Oliwa – Poles defeat Swedes
 1628 July 31 – Dutch ships under Pieter Ita attack and capture 2 Spanish treasure ships
 21 June – English defeat Venetians/French at Scanderoon (details)
 9 September Dutch squadron under Piet Hein attacks and captures Spanish treasure fleet
 29 September – French defeat English near La Rochelle
 1629 August 20 – Dutch under Piet Heyn defeat Dunkirkers off Scotland; Heyn is killed
 16 September – Swedes defeat Holy Roman Empire near Wismar (details)
 1630 September 4–8 – Danes force a retreat of Hanseatic ships in Elbe River (details)
 1631 September 12 – Undecided encounter between a Dutch and a Spanish/Portuguese fleet off Pernambuco (details)
 12–13 September The Slaak – Dutch Zeeland fleet under Marinus Hollare defeats Spanish invasion fleet
 1633 July 7 to 22 October Battle of Liaoluo Bay – Ming China defeats an allied fleet of Dutch East India Company and Chinese pirates, one company's vessel burnt and one captured by the Chinese, most of pirates' vessels sunk or captured
 1634 about early May – Maltese galleys defeat Turkish vessels at Zante
 19 July – Maltese galleys under Valdina defeat Tripolitans
 – Maltese under Villages defeat Turks
 – Maltese privateers defeat Turkish galleys
 1635 August 21 – Dunkirk squadron under Jacob Collaart (see Dunkirkers) defeat Dutch guardships and captures 60 fishing trawlers
 25 August – Dunkirk frigates under Jacob Collaart defeats Dutch escort capturing 24 fishing trawlers
 about 25 September – Spanish defeat Dutch West India Company convoy
 1636 early – Dutch Zeeland squadron under Johan Evertsen defeats Dunkirk fleet under Jacob Collaart
 1637 February – 8 Spanish under Miguel de Horna defeat Dutch convoy and escort near Cape Lizard and capture 17 merchant ships
 Spanish convoy commanded by Lope de Hoces captures 32 enemy ships in the English Channel on its return voyage to Spain. 
 1638 about 26 March – Spanish under Lope de Hoces defeat and captures Dutch convoy
 June – Maltese galleys defeat Tripolitan sailing ships near Calabria
 1 September- French defeat Spanish in galley fight at the battle of Vado near Genoa
 7 August – Venetians under Capello defeat Algerians at Corfu
 22 August – French under de Sourdis destroy Spanish galleons under Lope de Hoces at Guetaría (details)
 1639 February 19 – Dutch under Maarten Tromp defeat a Dunkirk fleet under Miguel de Horna (details)
 17–19 September Calais – Running fight between Dutch under Maarten Tromp and Spanish under Antonio de Oquendo who seeks shelter at The Downs
 30 September Mormugão – Dutch defeat Portuguese near Goa
 31 October Battle of the Downs – Dutch under Tromp defeat Spanish under Antonio de Oquendo in the English Channel
 end December – Spanish under Miguel de Horna defeat stronger French force
 1640 January 12–17 Pernambuco – Dutch fleet under Willem Loos defeats Spanish\Portuguese fleet under Dom Fernando de Mascarenhas (details)
 15 June – Dunkerquers defeat Dutch in the Shetland Isles (details)
 July? – French under Maillé Brézé defeat Spanish under Don Gomez de Sandoval
 1641 – French under de Sourdis defeat Spanish
 – Several French vs Spanish
 17 and 18 May – Spanish defeat French near Pensacola
 1 and 2 September ? – Spanish under Pietersen defeat French and Portuguese
 4 November – Dutch under Gijssels defeated by Spanish at Cape St. Vincent (details)
 1642 end of June, 2-day battle – French under Maillé Brézé defeat Spanish under Ciudad Real near Barcelona
 October – Portuguese defeat Spanish?
 1643 August – French defeat Spanish?

Danish-Swedish War (1643–45)

 1644 May 16 – Danes defeat Dutch ships which have been hired to support Sweden (details)
 25 May – Danes get slightly the better of 33 hired Dutch ships
 1 July Colberger Heide (Colberg Heath) – Danish and Swedish fleets fight an inconclusive battle off NE Germany
 7 July – Danes defeat Swedes in small battle (details)
 10 August – Dutch fleet under Thijsen brushes past Danish fleet under King Christian IV in Kjoge Bay, Denmark (details)
 13 October – Femern, Germany – Combined Swedish/Dutch fleet badly defeats Danish fleet

Cretan War (1645–69)

 1644 September 28 – Maltese galleys defeat Turkish sailing ships near Rhodes; their subsequent stay in Venetian-held Crete provoked the outbreak of war (details)
 1645 September 28 or 29 – Combined Christian fleet tries and fails to retake Canea (Chania) in Crete, from the Ottomans
 1 October – Christians vs Turks near Canea, Crete
 1646 May 26 – Venetians defeat Turkish attempt to break their blockade of the Dardanelles. (details)
 14 August – Inconclusive fight between Christians and the Ottoman fleet anchored at Chania Bay, Crete
 1647 January 27 – The Ottoman fleet of 45 galleys attacks the ship of the Venetian admiral Tommaso Morosini. Both Morosini and the Ottoman admiral, Kara Musa Pasha, are killed. After suffering significant casualties, the Turks are driven off by the arrival of the remaining Venetian fleet.
 25 August – Inconclusive skirmish between Christians and Turks
 9 September – Inconclusive skirmish between Christians and Turks
 1649 May 6 – Minor battle between Venetians and Turks
 12 May Focchies – Venetians defeat large Turkish fleet near western Turkey
 15 July – Venetians vs Turks near Candia, Crete (details)
 18 July – Venetians defeat Turks near Candia (details)
 1651 July 8 and 10 – Venetians under Mocenigo defeat Turks (details)
 1654 April – Maltese privateers defeat Turks near Rhodes
 16 May – Turks under Murad defeat Venetians under Giuseppe Delfino in Dardanelles (details)
 21 June – Turks retreat after skirmish with Venetians west of Milos
 1655 June 21 – Venetians under Lazaro Mocenigo defeat Turks under Mustapha in Dardanelles (details)
 1656 June 26 and 27 – Venetians and Maltese under Lorenzo Marcello defeat Turks under Chinam Pasha in Dardanelles (details)
 1657 May 3 – Venetians defeat Algerines (details)
 18 May – Venetians under Lazaro Mocenigo defeat Turks and Algerines at Suazich (details)
 17–19 July – Venetians, Maltese and Papal forces under Lazaro Mocenigo defeat Turks in Dardanelles (details)
 1658 May 19 – Venetians under Contarini defeat Turks between Imbros and the Dardanelles
 1659 August 26 (or 27?) – Venetians under Contarini vs Turks (details)
 1660 between 26 May and 12 June – Slight skirmish between Venetians and Turks
 1661 March (end) – Venetians defeat Turks in minor skirmish
 18 May – Venetians defeat Turks in minor skirmish
 27 August – Venetians and Maltese defeat Turks near Milos, Greece (details)
 1662 September 29 – Venetians defeat Turkish "Alexandria Caravan" between Kos and Kalymnos, Greece (details)
 1665 March – French under the Duc de Beaufort defeat Algerines near La Goulette, Tunisia (details)
 August – French under the Duc de Beaufort defeat Algerines at Cherchell, Algeria
 27 November – French under d'Escrainville defeat Turks
 1667 February 25 and 26 – Venetians under Molin defeat Turks and Tunisians north of Crete (details)
 1668 March 8 and 9 – Venetians defeat Turks near Pelagia, Greece (details)
 2 May – French defeat Turks (details)
 about September – Barbary "Turks" defeat Venetians south of Crete (details)
 1669 June – Privateers defeat "Alexandria Caravan" escort near Rhodes (details)

Anglo-Dutch Wars (1652–74)

 1652 May 29 Dover – Clash between English under Robert Blake and Dutch under Maarten Tromp's off Dover initiates the First Anglo-Dutch War
 26 August Plymouth – Michiel de Ruyter's 36 men-of-war hold off Ayscue's 45 men-of-war, driving them away
 7 September Elba (Monte Cristo) – Dutch under Jan van Galen beat back English under Richard Badiley
 8 October Kentish Knock (Zeeland Approaches) – English under Blake beat back Dutch under de With
 10 December Dungeness – Dutch under Tromp defeat English under Blake
 1653 February 28 – March 2 Portland (3 Days Battle) – Tromp loses nine men-of-war and about 25 merchantmen to an English fleet under Blake
 13 March Leghorn – Dutch under Johan van Galen defeat English under Badiley and Appleton
 12–13 June Gabbard (North Foreland) – English defeat Dutch
 8–10 August Scheveningen (Ter Heide, Texel) – Dutch under Maarten Tromp repulse English blockading fleet under George Monck with both sides retreating. Tromp is killed
 1664 December 29 – English squadron under Thomas Allin attacks Dutch merchant fleet (details)
 1665 June 13 Lowestoft – English fleet under James Stuart, Duke of York badly defeat Dutch fleet under Jacob van Wassenaer Obdam
 2 August Vågen – English squadron repelled attempting to capture richly laden Dutch merchant fleet in the bay of Bergen, Norway
 1666 May 20 – Undecided encounter between an English and a combined Dutch\French squadron at the isle of Nevis
 15 June James River (Virginia)-Dutch under Abraham Crijnssen attacks Virginia tobacco fleet (Details)
 11–14 June Four Days – Dutch under de Ruyter defeats English fleet commanded by Albemarle and Prince Rupert of the Rhine
 4–5 August St James's Day (North Foreland/Orfordness) – English under Albemarle and Prince Rupert of the Rhine defeat a Dutch fleet under de Ruyter
 1667 – English fleet under Admiral Sir John Harman destroys part of French fleet at Martinique
 9–14 June Raid on the Medway – Dutch raid Medway river near London. The English flagship, Royal Charles, is captured
 1672 March 12 – English squadron under Sir Robert Holmes attacks Dutch merchant fleet (Details)
 7 June – Solebay (Southwold) Dutch fleet under de Ruyter vs combined English/French under York
 1673 June 7 and 14 First and Second battles of Schooneveld
 21 August Texel (Kijkduin)
 1674 March 14 – Battle of Ronas Voe – English Navy defeat and capture Dutch East India Company ship Wapen van Rotterdam

Later 17th century

 1645 September 9 Tamandare – Dutch squadron under Jan Lichthart destroys a Portuguese squadron under Jerônimo Serrão de Paiva at Tamandaré Brazil
 1645 – Algerian Barbary pirates attempted an attack on Edinburgh, Scotland
 1646 La Naval de Manila – Two Spanish galleons with Spanish & Filipino crew repel a Dutch invasion fleet in 5 separate actions over several months around the Philippines
 1646? – French under du Mé defeat Spanish
 1646 14–16 June, Battle of Orbetello, Spanish defeat French invasion fleet commanded by Jean Armand de Maillé-Brézé
 1647 June 10 Puerto de Cavite – Spanish defeat Dutch attack near Manila
 1647 Neapolitan Republic (1647)- Spanish defeat French at Ischia, Pozzuoli, and Salerno and force French out of southern Italy. 
 1650 July 26 – Minor battle between Parliamentarians and Royalists/Portuguese near Lisbon
 20 October – Parliamentarians capture French frigate
 1654 March 23 Colombo – Skirmish between Dutch and Portuguese
 2 May – Dutch defeat Portuguese near Colombo (details)
 1655 – English naval bombardment of Algiers
 1655 April 14 – English under Robert Blake destroy Barbary ships at Porto Farina, northern Tunisia (details)
 – French under Vendôme defeat Spanish near Barcelona
 1657 April 20 – Santa Cruz de Teneriffe – English under Blake defeat Spanish
 12 and 13 September – Danes and Swedes fight inconclusively near Moen, Denmark (details)
 1658 November 8 The Sound – Dutch get the better of a Swedish fleet in a large battle near Copenhagen, in support of Denmark. Danish ships watch but are unable to participate
 1659 March 30 – Minor battle between Dutch and Danes against Swedes
 30 April – Small running battle between Dutch and Danes against Swedes (details)
 – Dutch/Danes under de Ruyter defeat Swedes and liberate Nyborg
 1661 – French naval bombardment of Algiers
 1669 December – Battle of Cádiz, English Mary Rose vs 7 Algerines
 1670 August – English/Dutch ships defeat Algerine force near Gibraltar
 1671 May – Privateers beat off a force of Turkish galleys near Egina, Greece
 1675 February 11 – French under Comte de Vivonne defeat Spanish under de la Cueva near Lipari Islands, Italy
 July (possible engagement) – English defeat Tripolitans
 1676 January 8 Stromboli (Alicuri) – Inconclusive fight between French under Abraham Duquesne vs Dutch and Spanish under Michiel de Ruyter
 January – English defeat Tripolitans
 22 April Agosta (Etna) – French fleet under Duquesne and Dutch/Spanish fleet under de Ruyter fight to a draw. De Ruyter is mortally wounded
 2 June Palermo – French under Comte de Vivonne defeat Dutch/Spanish under De la Cerda and Den Haen
 25 and 26 May/3 June and 4 – Dutch/Danish fleet under Niels Iuel defeat Swedes under Baron Creutz between Bornholm and Rugen in the Baltic Sea
 1/11 June Öland – Dutch/Danish fleet defeats Swedish fleet south of Öland in the Baltic Sea
 1677 March 3 Tobago – French under Jean II d'Estrées are repelled by Dutch under Jacob Binckes (details)
 31 May and 1/11 June – Danes defeat Swedes between Femern and Warnemunde, Baltic Sea (details)
 1/11 July and 2 Køge Bay – Danes and Dutch defeat Swedish fleet
 December Tobago – French under Jean II d'Estrées defeat Dutch under Jacob Binckes
 1678 – Undecided action of the isle of Ouessant between a Dutch squadron under Evertsen and a French squadron under Château-Renault
 1679 May 3 – Danes vs Swedes
 26 June 28 June, 2 and 20 July – Series of skirmishes culminating in a Danish victory over Sweden
 1681 July 23 – French defeats Tripolitans
 30 September – Spanish defeat Brandenburgers near Cape St. Vincent (details)
 1683 – French naval bombardment of Algiers
 1686 July 12 – Venetians attacks "Alexandria Caravan" with its Turkish and Tripolitan escort between Naxos and Nicaria
 4 October – Venetians vs Turks near Mitylene, Greece
 c. 1687/88? – Turks and Algerines, under Mezzo Morto, defeat Venetians
 1687–1688 – French naval bombardment of Algiers
 1688 June 15 – Venetians attacks "Alexandria Caravan" with its Turkish and Algerian escort east of Naxos, Greece
 1689 May 1/11 Battle of Bantry Bay – French defeat English off SW Ireland
 French vs English near Casquets
 1690 March 26 – Turks and Algerines under Mezzo Morto defeat Venetians under Valier (details)
 10 July Beachy Head (Beveziers) – French defeat Anglo-Dutch fleet
 – French vs English and Dutch near Madras
 8 September – Venetians fight the combined fleet of Turkey, Algiers, Tripoli and Tunis near Mitylene, Greece (details)
 1692 May 27 – 3 June Barfleur and La Hougue – Decisive defeat of French by English and Dutch in the War of the Grand Alliance
 – French defeat Spanish near Cape Finisterre
 – French defeat Tripolitans near Malta
 1693 June Lagos Bay – French under Tourville capture 50 out of 140 merchantmen
 1694 June 29 – French under Jean Bart defeat Dutch under Hidde de Vries and others (details)
 1695 February 9 and 19 – Turkish fleet defeats and then fights Venetians under Zeno (details)
 16 April – French defeat English (details)
 15 and 18 September – Venetians under Contarini vs Turks under Mezzo Morto
 1696 (mid) – Russians vs Turks near Ochakov, Black Sea
 17 June Dogger Bank – French defeat Dutch
 – French and English fight in Newfoundland
 – Fight near San Domingo
 14 July Bay of Fundy – French under Pierre Le Moyne d'Iberville defeat English
 22 August – Venetians under Contarini vs Turks and their allies under Mezzo Morto near Andros (details)
 1697 July 6, 1 and 20 September – Venetians under Contarini vs Turks in a series of battles in the Aegean Sea (details)
 1698 September 20 – Venetians vs Turks, Tripolitans and Tunisians near Samothrace, Greece (details)

18th century

Early 18th century

 1701 August 17 – Maltese raid on La Goulette
 1702 August 19–24 (OS) – English under Benbow – French under Ducasse draw (details)
 23 October Vigo Bay – Anglo-Dutch fleet defeat French and Spanish and destroy Spanish treasure fleet
 1703 May 22 Cap de la Roque/Bay of Biscay – French squadron attacks large Anglo-Dutch merchant fleet
 1704 August 24 Malaga – English and Dutch under Rooke narrowly defeat French near Malaga
 1707 October 21 The Lizard – 2 French squadrons under Forbin and Duguay-Trouin defeat British convoy and escort under Richard Edwards
 1708 June 8 – Wager's Action (Battle of Barú)
 1709 March 2 – British vs French (details)
 25 June – Maltese defeat Tripolitans near Cape Santa di Leuca
 1710 April 18 – Maltese defeat Algerines
 1713 April 12 – Maltese defeat Algerines
 – Portuguese defeat Indians near Cheul (details)
 1716 July 8 – Venetians under Corner fight an inconclusive battle against Turks under Jannum Koggia east of Corfu (details)
 1717 June 12, 13, 16 and 22 – Venetians under Flangini vs Turks in northern Aegean (details)
 19 July Matapan – Venetians and their allies vs Turks in Gulf of Laconia, Greece
 1718 – Portuguese defeat Indians near Karwar (details)
 20–22 July – Venetians vs Turks (details)
 11 August Cape Passaro – British under George Byng defeat Spanish near Sicily
 1738 June 20, 28 and 29 – Russians vs Turks
 9 and 10 August – Turks defeat Russians

Great Northern War (1700–21)

 1702 June 26 – Small-ship action between Sweden and Russia on Lake Ladoga
 7 September – Small-ship action between Sweden and Russia on Lake Ladoga
 1703 August 7 – Small-ship action between Sweden and Russia on Lake Peipus
 1704 May 17 – Small-ship action between Sweden and Russia on Lake Peipus
 1705 June 26 – Swedish ships attack Russian base of Kotlin
 1710 October 4 – Battle between Denmark under Gyldenløve and Sweden under Wachtmeister in Kjöge Bay (details)
 1712 April 11 – Danes under Knoff vs Swedes under Sjöblad (details)
 31 July and 17 August – Danes under Sehested fight and then defeat Swedes under Henck near Rugen (details)
 4 August – Very minor engagement between Russia and Sweden
 28 September – Very minor engagement between Denmark and Sweden
 1713 July 22 – Minor engagement between Sweden and Russia (details)
 1714 August 6 Gangut – Russian galleys under Apraksin defeat Swedish force
 1715 April 24 – Danes under Gabel defeat Swedes under Wachtmeister (details)
 1716 July 8 Dynekilen – Danes under Tordenskjold defeat Swedes
 1717 May 14 or 15 – Danish attack on Göteborg is defeated
 19 July – Danish attack on Strömstad is defeated
 1718 September 17 or 21 – Swedes under King Carl XII defeat Danes under Paulssen
 1719 June 4 Osel Island – Russians defeat Swedes under Wrangel
 13 July – Danes under Rosenpalm defeat Swedes at Strömstad
 1720 August 7 Grengam – Battle between Russian galley fleet under Galitzine and Swedish sailing ships under Sjöblad. Both sides claims victory

War of the Austrian Succession (1740–48)

 1741 January 7 and 8 – British vs French in West Indies
 12 February – Minor British vs French in Gibraltar Strait
 March–May Cartagena de Indias – Decisive Spanish victory against a large British fleet during the War of Jenkins' Ear
 10 August Colachel – Raja of Travancore in India defeats Dutch naval force at Colachel
 1742 May 31 – Swedes retreat after battle with Russians in Gulf of Finland (details)
 1744 February 22 Toulon (Cape Sicié) – Draw between Franco-Spanish and British fleets south of Toulon
 1746 June 25 (OS) – British under Edward Peyton vs French under la Bourdonnais
 1747 May 14 1st Cape Finisterre – British under Anson defeat French under de Jonquières
 25 October 2nd Cape Finisterre – British under Hawke defeat French under de l'Etenduère
 1747/48 – French under Labourdonnais vs British under Peyton near Negapatam
 1748 March 7 – British under Cotes defeat Spanish
 12 October – British vs Spanish near Havana (details)

Seven Years' War (1756–63)

 1755 June 8 Gulf of St. Lawrence – British under Boscawen defeat French under Hocquart
 1756 May 20 Minorca – French under la Galissonnière defeat British under John Byng
 1757 early – French under Kersaint de Coëtnempren vs British at San Domingo
 1758 – Minor French under Duchaffault vs British under Boscawen near Ushant
 – Minor French under Durevest vs British under Saunders near Gibraltar Strait
 29 April Cuddalore – British under Pocock defeat French under d'Ache
 3 August Negapatam – British under Pocock defeat French under d'Ache
 1759 August 19 Lagos – British under Boscawen defeat French under de la Clue
 10 September – Light Swedish force defeats similar Prussian force near Szczecin
 10 September Pondicherry – British fight French but are too damaged to pursue
 20 November Quiberon Bay/Cardinaux – British defeat French near St Nazaire
 1760 July 3–8 Restigouche River – British defeat French relief force
 1762 – British attack on Spanish-held Havana

Russo-Turkish War (1768–74)

 1770 May 27 and 28 – Russians vs Turks near southern Greece (details)
 4 June – Minor Russians vs Turks south of Athens (details)
 5–7 July Chesma – Russian fleet defeats and burns Turkish fleet off western Turkey
 1772 November 6–8 – Russians defeat Turks west of Patrai, Greece (details)
 1773 July 4 – Russians under Kinsbergen vs Turks (details)
 3 September – Russians under Kinsbergen vs Turks (details)
 September? – Russians vs Turks (details)
 1774 June 20 and 9/19 July – Russians under Tchitchagov and Seniavin vs Turks (details)

American War of Independence (1776–83)

 1776 October 11 Valcour Island – Benedict Arnold escapes the British fleet under Guy Carleton
 1777 September 26 to 16 November 1777 Siege of Fort Mifflin on the Delaware River American fleets under John Hazelwood, defending Philadelphia from British navy.
 1778 April 19 Frederica Naval Action
 27 July First Ushant – British under Keppel with 30 ships of the line fight inconclusive action against French under d'Orvilliers with 28 ships
 1779 July 6 Grenada
 end – French vs British under Hyde Parker near Fort Royal, Martinique
 1780 January 16 Cape St. Vincent – British under Rodney defeat Spanish under de Langara
 17 April Martinique – British under Rodney fail to defeat French under de Guichen
 9 August Spanish-French fleet under Luis de Córdova y Córdova captures 55 ship British convoy off Cape Santa María
 Spanish-French fleet under Luis de Córdova y Córdova captures 29 ship British convoy
 1781 April 16 Porto Praya – French under Suffren vs British, in the Cape Verde Islands
 19 April Fort Royal
 – Minor French under de Grasse vs British under Hood
 – Minor French under Destouches vs British under Arbuthnot
 21 July Cape Breton Island – French attack British convoy
 5 August (15 NS?) Dogger Bank – Draw between Dutch and British squadrons
 5 September Chesapeake Bay – French under de Grasse drive off British under Graves
 12 December Second Ushant – British under Kempenfelt capture part of a French convoy from de Guichen
 1782 January 25 St Kitts – British under Hood defeat French under de Grasse
 17 February Sadras – First fierce but indecisive fight between French under Suffren and British under Hughes near south-east India
 9 and 12 April The Saintes – British under Rodney decisively defeat French under de Grasse in the West Indies
 12 April Providien – 2nd fight between Suffren and Hughes off India
 21 April – British defeat French
 6 July Negapatam – 3rd fight between Suffren and Hughes off India
 3 September Trincomalee – Hughes fleet damages Suffren's but withdraws
 20 October Cape Spartel – Franco-Spanish fleet under Luis de Córdova y Córdova fights British fleet under Richard Howe in indecisive battle. Howe resupplies Gibraltar
 1783 June 20 Cuddalore – Suffren prevents Hughes seizing Cuddalore. Last of the five battles between Suffren and Hughes

Russo-Turkish War (1787–92)

 1787 August 30 – Russians vs Turks
  27, 28 and 30 September – Russians vs Turks
 15 October – Russians defeat Turks
 1788 June 17, 18, 28 and 29 and 9 July – Russian and Turkish land and sea forces clash near Ochakov (details)
 14/25 July Ochakov – Russia defeats Turkey near Fidonisi
 1789 June 2–4 – Russians defeat Turks at Sinope (details)
 1790 July 19 Kerch Strait – Slight Russian victory over Turks
 8 and 9 September Tendra – Russians defeat Turks
 31 October – Russians defeat Turks at the Sulina mouth
 17 November 18 – Russians defeat Turks at Tultcha
 29 November – Russians defeat Turks at Ismail (details)
 30 November, 1, 2, 4–7 December – Russians defeat Turks
 1791 July 9 Matchin – Russians defeat Turkish rowing vessels
 11 August Cape Kaliakra – Slight Russian victory over Turks in a largely inconclusive battle near Bulgaria

Russo-Swedish War (1788–90)

The Russian calendar was eleven days behind the Swedish during the 18th century, so Russian dates are eleven days earlier. 
 1788 July 17 (6 July OS) Hogland – Bloody engagement between Swedish and Russian battlefleets. Both sides lose a ship, but Swedes withdraw
 1789 July 26 (15 July OS) Öland – Indecisive action between the Swedish and Russian battlefleets.
 24 and 25 August ( 13 and 14 August OS) First Svensksund/Ruotsinsalmi in Finland – Russian galley flotilla decisively defeats Swedes.
 18 September (7 September OS) – Russians defeat Swedes in a small battle in Barösund near Ingå in Finland.
 1790 May 13 (2 May OS) Reval – Disastrous Swedish attack on Russian battlefleet at Reval (now Tallinn).
 15 May (4 May OS) Fredrikshamn/Hamina in Finland – Swedish galley flotilla defeats Russian galley flotilla.
 3 and 4 June ( 23 and 24 May OS) – Action off Kronstadt – Indecisive action between the battlefleets.
 3 July (22 June OS) Vyborg Bay – The Swedish battlefleet and galley flotilla break through the Russian blockade, suffering heavy losses.
 9 and 10 July ( 28–29 June OS) Second Svensksund/Ruotsinsalmi in Finland – Decisive victory of the Swedish galley flotilla. The largest naval battle in the Baltic Sea of all times. Extremely heavy losses suffered by the Russians.

French Revolutionary War (1793–1802)

 1794 January 22 and 25 – French attack British convoy (details)
 23 April – British defeat French frigates (details)
 1 June The Glorious First of June – British fleet defeats French fleet in North Atlantic but French grain convoy makes it through to Brest
 8 June – French vs British near Jersey
 23 August – British defeat French near Brest
 22 October – French vs British near Mauritius
 6 November – French capture HMS Alexander (details)
 1795 March 13 and 14 – British under Hotham vs French under Martin (details)
 8 and 9 June – British vs French near Belle Isle
 23 June Groix – British under Hood defeat French under Villaret-Joyeuse off Groix, France
 13 July – British vs French (details)
 7 October – British vs French (details)
 1797 February 14 Cape St. Vincent – British under Jervis defeat Spanish near Gibraltar
 26 March – Austrian vessels, supported by Venetian battleship, fight off small French attack (details)
 16 May – Danish vessels get the better of Tripolitans near Tripoli, Libya (details)
 11 October Camperdown (Kamperduin) – British fleet under Admiral Duncan defeats Dutch
 1798 August 1–3 The Nile (Aboukir Bay) – British under Nelson defeat moored French fleet under Brueys in Egypt
 12 October – British defeat French invasion force off western Ireland (details)
 28 October – Minor British vs French
 1799 September 3, 4, 5 and 10 – Minor light skirmishes between British and Spanish
 1800 August 4 – French attack British convoy (details)
 1801 April 5 Copenhagen – British under Nelson destroy moored Danish ships off Copenhagen to prevent France taking them over
 6–12 July Algeciras – French defeat initial British assault, British counter-attack and defeat Franco-Spanish force.

19th century

Napoleonic Wars (1803–15)

 1803 May 23, 24 and 27 – 4 ships take on Tripolitan gunboat force (details)
 31 May 1 June – Adams vs Tripolitan gunboats
 – Duckworth (British) defeats Rochambeau (French) near Santo Domingo
 1804 February 15 Pulo Aura – French attack British convoy
  3, 7, 23/24 August and 28 and 2–5 September raids on Tripoli (details)
 1805 about February – French squadron raids British (details)
 4 July? – French capture British East Indiaman (details)
 1805 July 4 – 2 Russian ships defeat French gunboat force (details)
 18 July Battle of Blanc-Nez and Gris-Nez – Combined Dutch and French flottila repulses a attack by a superior British squadron
 22 July Cape Finisterre – Inconclusive action between British Admiral Calder and French Admiral Villeneuve
 6 August – French attack British convoy (details)
 21 October Trafalgar – Nelson defeats combined Franco-Spanish fleet under Admiral Villeneuve, losing his life but gaining control of the oceans for Britain for the rest of the war
 4 November – British capture 4 French battleship survivors from Trafalgar
 1806 February 6 San(to) Domingo – British under Duckworth defeat French under Leissegues (French) off Santo Domingo
 4 July – Russians defeat French in Narenta Channel
 26 July – British defeat Dutch (details)
 25 September – British battleships defeat French frigate force (details)
 1807 February 19 – British battleships under Duckworth burn several Turkish ships in Dardanelles (details)
 May – British vs Turks at mouth of Dardanelles (details)
 22 May 23 Dardanelles – Russians under Admiral Seniavin defeat Turks near Cape Janizary
 1 July Athos (Lemnos/Monte Sancto) – Russians under Seniavin defeats Turks in northern Aegean
 23 and 31 August – Danes defeat British light forces near Copenhagen (details)
 2–7 September Copenhagen – British forces under Admiral Gambier and General Cathcart capture the Danish fleet
 1808 9–14 June – Capture of Rosily Squadron
 3 March Spain captures French battleship Atlas.
 1809 April 11–24 – British destroy French ships at Basque Roads
 13–17 April – British capture French battleship near Porto Rico
 late May – HMS Melpomène vs Danish gunboats
 25–27 June – British and Sicilians vs French near Pozzuoli Bay
 26 and 31 October Cette and ? – Southern France
 18 November – French frigates defeat British East Indiamen near Mauritius (details)
 13 December – French frigates capture HMS Junon (details)
 1810 July 3 – French frigate force defeats British East Indiamen in Mozambique Channel (details)
 26 August Grand Port – French defeat British at Vieux Grand Port, Mauritius
 31 August – British vs French near Toulon
 1811 March 13 Lissa – British frigates under Hoste defeat larger Franco-Venetian squadron under Dubordieu off Lissa (Vis) in the Adriatic
 29 November – Britain captures French frigate (details)
 1812 February 22 – Britain captures French battleship Rivoli (details)
 12 July Lyngør – British sink last Danish frigate
 1813 November 5 – Skirmish between British and French near Toulon (details)

South American Independence wars

 1811 March 2 – Spanish defeat Argentines under Juan B. Azopardo at San Nicolás on the Paraná River
 1814 March 11 – Argentines under William Brown attack Spanish under Romerate (details)
  14, 16 and 17 May – Argentines under William Brown defeat Spanish (details)
 1823 May 4 – Brazilians under Cochrane vs Portuguese (details)
  2, 4 and 6 July – Brazilians under Cochrane vs Portuguese
 24 July Lake Maracaibo – Republican naval forces of Venezuela vs Spanish Empire fleet in Lake Maracaibo that includes siege of Defensive Castles in Zapara, San Fernando and San Carlos islands

War of 1812

 1812 July 19 First Battle of Sacket's Harbor – US turns back British naval attack
 1813 May 28–29 Second Battle of Sacket's Harbor – US General Jacob Brown turns back British under Sir George Prevost
 September 13 Battle of Lake Erie- US squadron under Oliver Hazard Perry defeats British under Robert Heriot Barclay, gaining control of the lake
 1814 September 11 Plattsburgh (Lake Champlain) – US squadron under Thomas Macdonough defeats British under George Downie

Greek War of Independence

 1821 March 4 – Greeks vs Turks north-west of Zakynthos
 June 5, 6 and 8 – Greeks defeat Turks
 August 10 – c. 13 – Skirmishes
 October 1 – Skirmish
 1822 March 4
 May 31
 June 18–19 – Greek fireships under Konstantinos Kanaris blow up the flagship of Ottoman admiral Kara Ali Pasha
 1823 September 27 – Greeks vs Turks west of Lemnos
 October 23 – Greeks vs Turks near Pondikonisi
 1824 August 11, 12, 13, 16, 17 and c. 26 – Various skirmishes between Greeks and Turks/Egyptians/Tunisians
 September 1 – First Budrum – Greeks vs Turks and Egyptians
 September 9 – Second Budrum
 September 22 – Greeks vs Egyptians near Nikaria
 September 29
 November 12 and 13 – Greeks vs Turks and Egyptians near Spinalonga
 1825 April 29
 May 26
 June 1 – Greeks defeat Turks between Euboea and Andros
 June 14 and 15 – Greeks defeat Turks and Egyptians near Suda Bay
 June 28 and 29 – Greeks vs Turks and Egyptians south of Cerigo
 August 3 – Greeks defeat Turks near Missolonghi
 November 14 – Greeks under Miaoulis vs Turks/Egyptians/Algerines/Tripolitans near Navarin
 November 25, 26, 29, 30 and December 6 and 7 – Greeks vs Turks (and allies?) near Missolonghi
 1826 January 22 and 28 – Greeks vs Turks
 April 15
 July 27 and 28 – Greeks vs Turks near Samos
 September 10 and 11 – Greeks vs Turks near Mitylene
 October 7 (6?) – Greeks vs Turks in Aegean Sea (?)
 1827 September 29 – "Greeks" (Frank Abney Hastings) vs Turks in Salona Bay
 October 20 Navarino – British/French/Russian squadrons, under Admirals Codrington, de Rigny, and Geiden, destroy Turkish/Egyptian/Tunisian fleet of Tahir Pasha off south-west Greece
 1828 January 31 – British and French defeat Greek pirates at Grambusa
 June 9 (May 26 OS) – Russians defeat Turks near Braila (Russo-Turkish War)

Cisplatine War
 1826 February 9 – Argentina vs Brazil
 Punta Collares
 June 11 Los Pozos (Quilmes) – 11 Argentine vessels under William Brown defeat 31 Brazilian vessels near Buenos Aires
 1827 February 9 Juncal – 15 Argentines ships under Brown defeat 17 Brazilians under Pereira
 February 24 – Argentines under Brown vs Brazilians near Quilmes
 April 6 and 7 Monte Santiago – Brazilian fleet defeat Argentine navy under William Brown south of Buenos Aires

Later 19th century

 1833 July 5 Cape St. Vincent – Portuguese fleet under British officer Sir Charles Napier defeats and captures fleet of Portuguese usurper king Dom Miguel
 1842 – Argentinians under William Brown defeat Uruguayans
 1843 April 30 – Texans under Commodore Edwin Ward Moore draws with Mexicans under Thomas Marin near Campeche
 Texans under Moore destroy Mexican fleet.  This marks the only time in history a Sail Navy defeated a Steam Navy in battle.
 1845 November 20 Obligado – British/French ships force passage of Parana River as part of the larger Anglo-French blockade of the Río de la Plata on the Argentine Confederation.
 1849 May 3 – Schleswig-Holstein vs Denmark near Kiel
 May 11 – Schleswig-Holstein vs Denmark near Bulk
 1853 October 30 Sinop – Russian battleships defeat Turkish frigates at Sinope, Turkey
 1854 August & September – British-French attack on Petropavlovsk (details)
 October Allied (British, French and Turkish) fleet Bombardment of Sebastopol as part of Siege of Sevastopol (1854–1855) during the Crimean War
 1857 26 June - Ningpo massacre - battle between Chinese pirates and Portugal during the Qing dynasty, Chinese victory
 1862 March 8 and 9 Hampton Roads – First battle between ironclad warships
March 14 – New Bern
May 15 – Drewry's Bluff
October 4 – Galveston Harbor
 1864 February Eckernfjorde – Danish ships defeated by Prussia
 March 17 Jasmund – Prussians vs Danes
 May 9 Helgoland – Danish fleet defeats Prussian-Austrian fleet in the North Sea
 1865 June 11 Riachuelo – Brazilian fleet defeats Paraguayan fleet in Paraná river
 1866 February 7 Abtao – Spain vs Peru/Chile
 May 2 Callao
 July 20 Lissa – Austrians under Admiral von Tegetthoff rams and drives off superior Italian fleet under Persano
 1869 May 4–10 Hakodate
Notable for seeing the first combat use of the torpedo.
 1879 May 21 Iquique – During the War of the Pacific
 8 October Angamos – During the War of the Pacific
 1884 August 23 Foochow – Small French squadron annihilates Chinese force at Foochow (Fuzhou)
 1885 February 13 Raid on Shipu – French attack Chinese ships
 1891 April 23 Battle of Caldera Bay - Chilean Balmacedist torpedo boats sink a Chilean Congressionalist frigate.
 1892 July 6 Homestead Strike – armed striking union members in boats engage two armed barges
 1893–94 Brazilian Civil War
 1894 July 25 Feng-tao – Imperial Japanese Navy defeats Imperial Chinese Navy
 17 September Yalu River – Japanese defeat Chinese off Korea
 1898 May 1 Manila Bay
 3 July Santiago de Cuba

20th century

Russo-Japanese War (1904-1905)
 1904 February 9 Chemulpo –  scuttled during the Russo-Japanese War
 9 February Port Arthur
 10 August Yellow Sea – Minor Japanese victory over Russia
 14 August Japanese Sea (Ulsan) – Minor Japanese victory over Russia
20 August Korsakov 
 4–5 October Dogger Bank incident – Russian fleet fires on British trawlers that have been mistaken for Japanese torpedo-boats
 1905 May 27–28 Tsushima – Japanese defeat Russians in large fleet battle between Korea and Japan

Italo-Turkish War (1911-1912)
 1911 September 29–30 Preveza – Italians defeat Ottomans
 1912 January 7 Kunfuda Bay – Italians defeat Ottomans
 1912 February 24 Beirut – Italians defeat Ottomans

First Balkan War (1912-1913)
 1912 November 21 Kaliakra – Bulgarians defeat Ottoman fleet
 1912 December 3 Elli – Greeks defeat Ottoman fleet
 1913 January 18 Lemnos – Greeks defeat Ottoman fleet

Second Balkan War (1913)
 1913 July 14-15 Romanian landings in Bulgaria – Romanians carry out successful landings in Bulgaria, leading to Bulgaria having to sue for peace two weeks later

World War I (1914–18)

Russian Civil War (1917-22)
 1919 – 17 June and 18 August British raids on Kronstadt during the British campaign in the Baltic (1918–1919)

Spanish Civil War (1936-39)
 1936 – 29 September Cape Espartel
1937 – 5 March Cape Machichaco
 1937 – 7 September Cape Cherchell
 1938 – 5–6 March Cape Palos

World War II (1939–45)
 1939–45 Battle of the Atlantic (1939-1945)
 1939
 13 December River Plate
 1940
 10 and 13 April First and Second Battles of Narvik
 8 June Operation Juno – German battleships Gneisenau and Scharnhorst sink the aircraft carrier HMS Glorious and two destroyers off Norway
 The German cruiser Admiral Hipper sinks the destroyer HMS Glowworm off of Norway
 3 July Mers-el-Kebir – British fleet attacks French fleet in harbour in Algeria
 9 July Calabria (Punta Stilo) – British fleet attacks Italian fleet
 19 July Cape Spada – HMAS Sydney sinks Italian cruiser Bartolomeo Colleoni off Crete
 24–27 August Convoy HX 65 – 8 ships sunk in North Atlantic
17 September – 1 October Convoy HG 73 – 9 ships sunk in North Atlantic
 20–22 September Convoy HX 72 – 11 ships sunk in the North Atlantic.
 September 23–35 Dakar – Vichy French fight off a British/Free French landing at Dakar
 16–19 October Convoy SC 7 – 20 ships sunk in North Atlantic
 19–20 October Convoy HX 79 – 12 ships sunk in North Atlantic
5 November Convoy HX 84 – 5 ships sunk in North Atlantic
 11 November Taranto – British air attack on Italians anchored at Taranto, inspiring the Japanese attack on Pearl Harbor
 27 November Cape Spartivento (Cape Teulada) – British fight back an Italian interception
 1–3 December Convoy HX 90 – 11 ships sunk in North Atlantic
 1941
 17 January Ko Chang – French defeat Siamese
 8–11 February Convoy HG 53 – 9 ships sunk and 1 German Fw 200 Condor shot down
 2–8 March Convoy OB 293 – 3 ships and 2 U-boats sunk in North Atlantic
 28 March Cape Matapan – British fleet defeats Italian fleet in night action
 2–5 April Convoy SC 26 – 10 ships sunk and 1 U-boat destroyed in North Atlantic
 16 April – British ships attack Italian convoy Duisburg. Lampo, Tarigo and Baleno are sunk, as well as HMS Mohawk
 7–10 May Convoy OB 318 – 7 ships sunk and 1 U-boat captured in North Atlantic
 21 May – 1 June – Battle of Crete – Royal Navy loses three cruisers and 6 destroyers to Axis air attacks
 24 May – Battle of the Denmark Strait – Bismarck and Prinz Eugen sink HMS Hood
 24–27 May – Hunt for the German battleship Bismarck ends in her sinking
 13–25 August Convoy OG 71 – 10 ships sunk in North Atlantic
 27–31 August – Soviet evacuation of Tallinn
 9–11 September Convoy SC 42 – 14 ships and 2 U-boats sunk in North Atlantic
 17 September – 1 October Convoy HG 73 – 9 ships sunk in North Atlantic
 14–18 October Convoy SC 48 – 11 ships sunk in North Atlantic
 19 November – HMAS Sydney and the German surface raider Kormoran destroy each other in a single ship action off Western Australia; Sydney is lost with all hands
 7 December Pearl Harbor, also starting the Pacific War
 10 December South China Sea – HMS Prince of Wales and HMS Repulse sunk by Japanese air attack
 13 December Cape Bon – British destroyers sink Italian cruisers
 17 December First Sirte – Indecisive British-Italian fight off Libya
 17 December Battle of Jibrieni – Soviets attack an Axis convoy, losing a submarine
 19–23 December Convoy HG 76 – 4 ships sunk and 5 U-boats destroyed
 1942
 19 February Bombing of Darwin – Japanese carrier task force attacks Australia
 21–25 February Convoy ON 67 – 8 ships sunk in North Atlantic
27 February Java Sea – Japanese invasion convoy escorts destroy ABDA fleet
 22 March Second Sirte – Italian fleet obstacles a British convoy to Malta, hit escorts, but failed to sink the cargo ships. Delay of the convoy led to the loss of four freighters by air attack
 31 March - 10 April Indian Ocean Raid – Japanese task force attacks Ceylon
14 April Convoy OG 82 – 1 U-boat sunk
 8 May Coral Sea – Japanese invasion convoy turned back by US carrier aircraft. First carrier battle in history.
 1942–44 German U-Boats campaign in Gulf of St. Lawrence
 4–5 June Midway – invasion convoy retreats after US sinks four Japanese carriers and one Japanese heavy cruiser
 12–15 June Operation Vigorous – 6 ships sunk from convoy to Malta. The rest of the convoy is driven back
 14–15 June Operation Harpoon – 6 ships sunk from convoy to Malta
 2–4 July Convoy PQ 17 – 24 ships sunk from Arctic convoy to Soviet Union
 5–10 August Convoy SC 94 – 11 ships and 2 U-boats sunk in North Atlantic
 8 August Savo Island – Japanese sink 4 cruisers escorting Guadalcanal invasion convoy
 11–15 August Operation Pedestal – 13 ships sunk from convoy to Malta
 24 August Eastern Solomons – Japanese aircraft carrier Ryujo sunk while attacking Guadalcanal
 10–14 September Convoy ON 127 – 7 ships sunk in North Atlantic
 12–16 September Convoy TAG 5 – 2 ships sunk in Caribbean Sea
 12 October Cape Esperance US cruisers intercept Japanese cruiser force approaching Guadalcanal
 12–16 October Convoy SC 104 – 8 ships and 2 U-boats sunk in North Atlantic
 26 October Santa Cruz Islands – USS Hornet sunk in aircraft carrier battle near Guadalcanal
 26–29 October Convoy HX 212 – 6 ships sunk in North Atlantic
 27–31 October Convoy SL 125 – 11 ships sunk decoying U-boats away from Operation Torch
 1–4 November Convoy SC 107 – 15 ships and 1 U-boat sunk in North Atlantic
 2–8 November Convoy TAG 18 – 6 ships sunk in Caribbean Sea
 6–11 November Convoy TAG 19 – 2 ships sunk in Caribbean Sea
 8 November Casablanca – French ships attempt to defend Moroccan neutrality
 12–15 November Guadalcanal – decisive US victory, last offensive Japanese operation attempted in the Guadalcanal campaign, 11 transports and 2 battleships sunk. heavy losses on both sides in 2 night surface actions.
 30 November Tassafaronga US cruisers intercept Japanese destroyers resupplying Guadalcanal, but suffer heavy losses from torpedo attack
 26–30 December Convoy ON 154 – 14 ships and 1 U-boat sunk in North Atlantic
 31 December Barents Sea – British escorts fight off German surface attack on convoy JW 51B
 1943
 3–12 January Convoy TM 1 – 7 ships sunk in North Atlantic
29 January Rennell Island – USS Chicago lost
 4–7 February Convoy SC 118 – 8 ships and 1 U-boat sunk in North Atlantic
 21–25 February Convoy ON 166 – 11 ships and 2 U-boats sunk in North Atlantic
 2–4 March Bismarck Sea – aircraft sink 12 ships from a Japanese troop convoy to New Guinea
 6 March Battle of Blackett Strait – an American task force intercepts 2 Japanese destroyers and sinks them both.
 6–9 March Convoy SC 121 – 7 ships sunk in North Atlantic
 10–11 March Convoy HX 228 – 5 ships and 2 U-boats sunk in North Atlantic
 16–19 March Convoys HX 229/SC 122 – 22 ships and 1 U-boat sunk in largest North Atlantic U-boat wolfpack attack
 26 March Komandorski Islands – US cruiser force intercepts a Japanese Aleutian Islands convoy
 18–20 May Convoy SC 130 – 3 U-boats sunk in North Atlantic
 29 April – 6 May Convoy ONS 5 – 12 ships and 6 U-boats sunk in last major North Atlantic U-boat wolfpack attack
 6 July Kula Gulf
 12–13 July Battle of Kolombangara
 6–7 August Battle of Vella Gulf – American destroyers intercept the "Tokyo Express" and sink 3 Japanese destroyers.
 6 October – Naval Battle of Vella Lavella
 23 October – German light force defeats similar British force (details)
 26–29 October Convoy ON 207 – 3 U-boats sunk by a combination of air and naval support in the North Atlantic
 27–31 October Convoy SL 138/MKS 28 – 1 ship and 1 U-boat destroyed in North Atlantic
 2 November Empress Augusta Bay
 18–21 November Convoy SL 139/MKS 30 – 1 ship and 3 U-boats sunk
 26 November Battle of Cape St. George – American destroyers intercept the "Tokyo Express" and sink 3 Japanese destroyers.
 26 December North Cape – convoy JW 55B escorts sink Scharnhorst off northern Norway
 28 December Operation Stonewall – Allied ships and aircraft sink three German destroyers in the Bay of Biscay
 1944
 17 February Operation Hailstone – Allied fleet attacks former Japanese naval stronghold at Truk Lagoon in the central Pacific, Japanese defenders lose many aircraft and merchant ships
 9 June Battle of Ushant – Allied 10th destroyer flotilla (UK/Canadian/Polish ships) engage and defeat remnants of the German 8th destroyer flotilla off Brittany
 19 June Philippine Sea – US invasion of Saipan initiates the largest aircraft carrier battle in history including "The Great Marianas Turkey Shoot"
 23–26 October Leyte Gulf – US invasion of the Philippines produces a decisive battle with the Japanese fleet including four main actions – the Sibuyan Sea, Surigao Straits, off Samar and Cape Engano. First use of Kamikaze tactics by the Japanese.
 1945
 1 April – 25 May Battle of Okinawa – The Japanese lose their last significant naval force, including the battleship Yamato. Large scale systematic Kamikaze operations conducted by Japanese air forces.
 15–16 May Battle of the Malacca Strait – British 26th Destroyer Flotilla ambush and sink the Japanese heavy cruiser Haguro.

Later 20th century

 1948
 October 1948 - Israeli naval campaign in Operation Yoav
 19 October 1948 - Battle near Majdal - Israeli corvettes and submarine chaser engage an Egyptian corvette and aircraft.
 22 October 1948 - Sinking of the Emir Farouk - Israeli patrol ship and explosive boats intercept and sink the Egyptian flagship, Emir Farouk off Gaza.
 1949
 20 April-30 July - Amethyst Incident - British warships come under fire by Communist Chinese coastal artillery, forcing more Royal Navy ships to come to their rescue.
 1950 
 25–26 June 1950 - Battle of Korea Strait - South Korean submarine chaser engages and sinks North Korean steamer. 
 2 July – Battle of Chumonchin Chan – US and British cruisers intercept Korean People's Navy convoy during the Korean War
 10 September 1950 - Battle of Haeju - South Korean patrol ship sinks a North Korean minelayer.
 10–19 September Battle of Incheon – UN Command amphibious invasion in support of South Korea
 1951
 29 June - Manhattan Rebellion - Royal Thai Navy flagship, HTMS Sri Ayudhya is sunk by coastal guns during a failed coup. 
 28–30 September 1951 - Battle of the Han River - Australian frigate HMAS Murchison destroys Chinese coastal batteries. 
1953
 Dongshan Island Campaign - Taiwanese fleet and amphibious forces attempt to retake Dongshan Island from China. Operation fails with a loss of three tank landing ships. 
 1954
 Dongji Islands Campaign
 15 May - Two Chinese gunboats engage a Taiwanese fleet, damaging a destroyer escort.
 16 May - Chinese fleet engages Taiwanese destroyer escort ROCS Tai Ho and damagers her, forcing her to retreat. 
 First Taiwan Strait Crisis
 14 November - Sinking of ROCS Tai Ping - Taiwanese destroyer escort ROCS Tai Ping is sunk by four Chinese torpedo boats off the Dachen Islands. 
 1956
 29 October - 7 November 1956 - Suez Crisis
 30 October 1956 - Battle off Haifa - Israeli and French destroyers engage and capture the Egyptian destroyer escort ENS Ibrahim el-Awal.
 31 October 1956 - Sinking of the Domiat - British light cruiser HMS Newfoundland and destroyer [[HMS Diana (D126)|HMS Diana]] engage and sink the Egyptian frigate ENS Domiat.
 1958
 23 August-2 December Second Taiwan Strait Crisis
 24 August - First Battle of Jinmen Island - Chinese torpedo boats attack a Taiwanese convoy off Jinmen Island, sinking a transport and damaging a landing ship.
 2 September - Second Battle of Jinmen Island - Chinese torpedo boats, again, attack a Taiwanese convoy off Jinmen Island, losing two torpedo boats and damaging a submarine chaser.
 24 September - Battle of Dongding Island - Chinese gunboats and landing craft attempt to land on Dongding Island, but are repelled by Taiwanese warships. One Taiwanese landing ship is sunk, while another is damaged. 
 1961 
 17–19 December 1961 - Annexation of Goa
 18 December 1961 - Battle of Mormugao Harbor - Indian frigates INS Betwa & INS Beas engage and sink the Portuguese sloop NRP Afonso de Albuquerque.
 18 December 1961 - Naval Action at Daman - Portuguese patrol boat NRP Antares escapes Indian air strikes.
 18 December 1961 - Naval Action at Diu - Indian light cruiser, INS Delhi sinks Portuguese patrol boat NRP Vega.
 1962
 15 January - Battle of Arafura Sea - Three Indonesian fast attack craft engage three Dutch destroyers off New Guinea, but attack is successfully repelled. 
 1964 
 Gulf of Tonkin Incident – encounter between the USS Maddox and three Vietnam People's Navy torpedo boats near North Vietnam. Lead to the Gulf of Tonkin Resolution and the escalation of the Vietnam War, although the incident was later found to be misrepresented by the U.S. government.
 1965 
 Project National Glory
 1 May - Battle of Dong-Yin - Taiwanese submarine chaser ROCS Dong Jiang repels an attack by eight Chinese gunboats, sinking four of them and damaging two.
 6 August - Battle of Dongshan - Taiwanese submarine chaser ROCS Zhang Jiang and patrol ship ROCS Jiang Men are sunk by Chinese torpedo boats.
 11 November - Battle of Chongwu - Chinese patrol ships and torpedo boats engage Taiwanese patrol ships ROCS Lin Huai and ROCS Shan Hai. Lin Huai is forced to run aground due to damage sustained in battle, while Shan Hai escapes.
 Operation Dwarka – Pakistan Navy engagement in Dwarka during the Second Indo-Pakistani War
 1967
 8 June – USS Liberty incident – Israeli Navy pioneers anti-ship use of napalm to disable American technical research ship during the Six-Day War
 11 July - Battle of Rumani Coast - Israeli destroyer INS Eilat and two torpedo boats sink two Egyptian torpedo boats.
 21 October – Egyptian Navy Komar-class missile boats sink Israeli destroyer INS Eilat in the first combat use of P-15 Termit surface to surface missiles
 1968
 23 January – North Korean Navy captures United States Navy technical research ship Pueblo
 1 March 1968 - Action of 1 March 1968 - US Coast Guard & South Vietnamese warships engage and sink four North Vietnamese naval trawlers.
 1970
 16 May - Sinking of the ENS El Qaher - Israeli aircraft sink the Egyptian destroyer ENS El Qaher during the War of Attrition.
 1971
 Operation Trident (Indo-Pakistani War)
 Operation Python (Indo-Pakistan War)
 Sinking of INS Khukri
 1972
 April – First Battle of Quang Tri—US cruiser-destroyer forces heavily and directly engaged in tank and artillery duals at and below DMZ and in defense of Dong Ha Bridge
 19 April – Battle of Đồng Hới – United States cruiser-destroyer force engages North Vietnamese forces
 9 May – Operation Pocket Money – United States Navy mines Hai Phong harbor
 10 May – Operation Custom Tailor – United States Navy attacks Hai Phong
 1973
 7 October – Battle of Latakia – Israelis defeat Syrian Navy during the Yom Kippur War 
 7 October - Battle of Marsa Talamat - Israeli patrol boats sink Egyptian patrol boat
 8–9 October – Battle of Baltim – Israelis defeat Egyptians
 11 October – Second Battle of Latakia – Israelis try to sink more Missile Boats and destroy onshore Oil Tanks, but only got probable results
 1974
 January Battle of the Paracel Islands – People's Liberation Army Navy defeats Republic of Vietnam Navy at Paracels Islands.
 1975
 April 1975 - East Sea Campaign - Series of clashes between North Vietnamese & South Vietnamese warships that ultimately led to the North Vietnamese capture of the Spratly Islands. 
 12–15 May 1975 - Mayaguez Incident - Khmer Rouge capture American cargo ship SS Mayaguez off Koh Tang, Cambodia. Frigate USS Harold E. Holt later rescues crew. 
 1980
 10 May - Sinking of the HMBS Flamingo - Bahamas patrol ship HMBS Flamingo was sunk by two Cuban MIG-21's. 
 Operation Morvarid – Iranian navy decisively defeats Iraqi navy (Destruction of 80% of the Iraqi Navy) during the Iran-Iraq War.

1982
The Falklands War
 25 April – Operation Paraquet – Royal Navy helicopters cripple Argentine submarine ARA Santa Fe while attempting to reinforce troops on South Georgia in the early phases of the Falklands War.
 30 April - Attack on the ARA Alferez Sobral - Two Royal Navy helicopters engage Argentine patrol ship ARA Alferez Sobral.
 2 May - Sinking of the ARA General Belgrano - British submarine HMS Conqeuror torpedoes and sinks Argentine light cruiser ARA General Belgrano .
 4 May - Sinking of HMS Sheffield - Argentine fighter jets sink the British destroyer HMS Sheffield with an Exocet missile.
 21–25 May – Battle of San Carlos – A battle between aircraft and ships when British forces landed on the shores of San Carlos Water during the Falklands War. British destroyer HMS Coventry and British frigates HMS Ardent and HMS Antelope are all sunk by bombs from Argentine light attack aircraft. 
 23 May – Battle of Seal Cove – A minor naval clash, it involves the attempt by two Royal Navy frigates to seize an Argentine Navy coaster. The coaster evaded capture by running aground.
 25 May - Sinking of SS Atlantic Conveyor - British cargo ship SS Atlantic Conveyor is sunk by two Argentine Exocet missiles fired from fighter jets.
8 June - Attack on the RFA Sir Galahad - British logistics ship RFA Sir Galahad is hit by three Argentine light attack aircraft bombs seriously damaging the vessel. The hulk would later be scuttled via torpedoes by HMS Onyx on 21 June. 
 11–12 June - Battle of Two Sisters - British destroyer HMS Glamorgan is struck and damgaged by an Exocet missile fired from an Argentine land-base launcher while providing naval gunfire support to Royal Marines.

 1986
 Action in the Gulf of Sidra (1986) – US Navy engages Libyan Navy in a fleet action.
 1987
 17 May - USS Stark incident - US frigate, USS Stark is attacked by two Exocet missiles fired from an Iraqi fighter jet, severely damaging it.
 21 September - Operation Prime Chance - US Navy SEALs board and capture and later scuttle the Iranian minelayer Iran Ajr.
 1988
 14 March - Johnson South Reef Skirmish - Chinese frigates engage and sink three Vietnamese transports.
 18 April Operation Praying Mantis – In the largest US naval engagement since World War II, the U.S. Navy defeats Islamic Republic of Iran Navy forces in retaliation for the mining of the USS Samuel B. Roberts during a patrol mission.
 1990
 2 August - Iraqi invasion of Kuwait - Most of the Kuwait Naval Force was destroyed by Iraqi air and naval forces, with surviving ships escaping to Bahrain.
 1991
 18–19 January - Battle of Ad-Dawrah - US frigate USS Nicholas & Kuwaiti fast attack craft, KNV Istiqal capture Iraqi oil platforms.
 24–29 January - Battle of Qurah and Umm al Maradim - USS Leftwich & USS Curts engage and sink four Iraqi warships.
 29 January – 2 February – The Battle of Bubiyan where Coalition warships and aircraft destroy the bulk of the Iraqi Navy during the Gulf War.
 1995
 14–16 November - Battle of the Dalmatian Channels - Yugoslav fleet engaged Croatian coastal artillery, losing three ships.
 1998
 23 February – The Sri Lankan Navy and LTTE Sea Tigers clash off Sri Lanka, killing more than 60.
 1999
 9–15 June Battle of Yeonpyeong South Korean flotilla defeats North Korean flotilla.

21st century
 2001
 22 December Battle of Amami-Ōshima Japanese coast guard vessels sink an armed North Korean spy trawler.
 2002
 29 June Second Battle of Yeonpyeong A South Korean naval patrol encounters North Korean intruders and force them to withdraw.
 2003
 20–24 March - Battle of Al Faw (2003) Joint British-American-Australian-Polish fleet conducts amphibious operation on the Al-Faw Peninsula in Iraq. Forces capture Iraqi ports and oil platforms.
 2006
 11 May – Battle of Point Pedro (2006) The Sri Lanka Navy and LTTE Sea Tigers clash, leaving 18 SLN personnel and around 50 Tigers dead.
 14 July - Attack on INS Hanit - Israeli corvette INS Hanit is struck by a land-launched C-802 anti-ship missile off the coast of Beirut and is damaged.
 2007
 19 June Battle of Point Pedro (2007) Naval battle between Sri Lanka Navy and LTTE Sea Tigers.
 2008
 9 August - The Russian Navy's Black Sea Fleet sinks a Georgian Navy ship during the Battle off the coast of Abkhazia
 2009
 10 November Battle of Daecheong A South Korean patrol damages a North Korean gunboat forcing it to withdraw.
 2010
 26 March ROKS Cheonan sinking South Korean corvette ROKS Cheonan is torpedoed and sunk by a North Korean Yono-class submarine.
 2011
 29 April – French frigate Courbet engages four Libyan RHIB mineplanters off Misrata, sinking one.
 8 May Battle of Falcon Lake, Mexican Naval Infantry attack a group of gunmen and a battle began that left twelve Los Zetas cartels members and one marine dead during the Mexican drug war.
 12 May – Canadian, British, and French ships repulse a Libyan naval attack on the city of Misrata during the Libyan Civil War.
 2014
 23 March - Capture of the Cherkasy - Ukrainian minesweeper Cherkasy is boarded and captured by Russian forces after attempting to flee Crimea.
 2016
 1 October - Attack on HSV-2 Swift - United Arab Emirates Navy ship Swift is attacked by a C-802 anti-ship missile launched by Houthie rebels off Yemen and is severely damaged.
 2017
 30 January - Attack on HMS Al Madinah - Royal Saudi Navy frigate HMS Al Madinah is struck by a remote controlled suicide boat by Houthie Rebels off Yemen and is severely damaged. 
 16 March – Somali pirates hijack an oil tanker
 2018
 25 November – 2018 Kerch Strait incident Russian and Ukrainian ships skirmish at Kerch Strait during the Russo-Ukrainian War
 2019
 26 November – Spanish police find a Narco-submarine off the coast of Galicia. The police managed to arrest the three drug traffickers, recover the $100 million drug cargo and sink the submarine. This is the first Narco-submarine sunk in Europe.
 2020
 17 May – British flagged tanker Stolt Apol'' is attacked by two pirate skiffs 75 nautical miles off the coast of Yemen in the Gulf of Aden and disables one skiff before escaping.
 2022
 24 February-30 June - Snake Island campaign between Russian Navy and Ukrainian Navy to conquer the island, this campaign ended with a Ukrainian victory.
 14 April - Destruction of the Moskva. RFS Moskva is struck by two Ukrainian R-360 Neptune anti-ship missiles, causing a chain reaction of explosions and later sinks.
 29 October - 2022 Crimea attacks. Ukrainian unmanned surface drones attack Sevastopol Naval Base in Crimea, damaging three Russian warships.

See also

 List of single-ship actions
 List of ships captured in the 19th century
 List of ships captured in the 18th century
 Maritime timeline
 Naval warfare

References

External links
 War index
 Naval history in Russian
 Naval history in English
 Naval-History.Net, Naval History of the 20th Century, World Wars 1, 2, post-war and Falklands War – navies, campaigns and battles

 
 
Naval
Naval battles